Amal Fashanu is a presenter, journalist, fashion designer and activist against homophobia in sport. She produced a BBC3 documentary Britain’s Gay Footballers. She is the Founder and CEO of The Justin Fashanu Foundation TJFF, as well as Black Heart Label, a clothing brand designed to promote activism through fashion, and Amal Fashanu Handbags. In 2012, Fashanu was a contributor to David Cameron's summit on discrimination in sport.

Biography 
Fashanu is the daughter of former footballer John Fashanu and Spanish model Marisol Acuna. She attended St Christina's School in London, before moving to Madrid in 1999 to study at Runnymede College. In 2006 she began her studies at Brunel University in London, receiving a BASc in Communications and Media Studies. Fashanu has a master's degree in handbag design from IED University in Madrid.

Whilst at university, Fashanu had a successful career as a model, notably modelling alongside Professor Green for Puma in FHM.

In 2012, Fashanu's BBC 3 Documentary Britain’s Gay Footballers was released to critical acclaim. Following the suicide of her uncle Justin Fashanu, Britain's first black £1m footballer who was also openly gay, the film explored homophobia and discrimination within the football world. The documentary was nominated for numerous awards, including a British Broadcasting Award in 2013.

Her second documentary The Batman Shootings  (2012) covered the massacre in a US cinema in which 12 people were killed by a lone shooter whilst watching The Dark Knight Rises. Her third, Find A Home For My Brother (2015) explored the care provisions that are in place for young people with learning disabilities in the UK and Ghana.

In 2012, Fashanu was invited by then British Prime Minister David Cameron to a summit on discrimination in football at Downing Street. Following this meeting, she was inspired to create her fashion label, Black Heart Label, which combines activism and fashion to promote equality. This line is dedicated to Justin Fashanu.

After undertaking an MA in handbag design from IED University, Fashanu created Amal Fashanu Handbags. The brand creates luxury handbags and accessories whilst promoting small businesses.

Fashanu works as a journalist and has reported for BBC News, BBC Radio, talkSPORT, Sky News, Sky Sport, The Huffington Post and The Guardian.

Fashanu and her father set up the Justin Fashanu Foundation to eliminate prejudice and tackle homophobia in sport.

References 

English women journalists
English fashion designers
English LGBT rights activists
Alumni of Brunel University London
Living people
Sexual orientation and sports
English people of Nigerian descent
English people of Guyanese descent
English people of Spanish descent
Year of birth missing (living people)
British women fashion designers